Late Night Tales: Ólafur Arnalds is a mix album compiled by Icelandic producer Ólafur Arnalds, released on  24 June 2016.

It is a part of the Late Night Tales series of albums released by Night Time Stories.

Track listing

References

2016 compilation albums
Ólafur Arnalds
Ólafur Arnalds albums